Prolyl aminopeptidase (proline aminopeptidase, Pro-X aminopeptidase, cytosol aminopeptidase V, proline iminopeptidase) is an enzyme. This enzyme catalyses the following chemical reaction

 Release of N-terminal proline from a peptide

This enzyme requires Mn2+ ion to function.

References

External links 
 

EC 3.4.11